American Flag is a ghost town in Pinal County, Arizona, five miles southeast of Oracle. The town was established in the late 1870s but shortly after 1890, the town had become abandoned.

History
American Flag was founded by prospector Isaac Lorraine as the American Flag mine and mining camp in the late 1870s. In 1881 the town was sold to the Richardson Mining Company of New York. The town was small and had a population of about forty on average. Little is known about the mining camp at this time. Eventually Isaac Lorraine would turn his attention to cattle, where he later built the American Flag Ranch. By 1884, the population was only fifteen so the post office closed a few years later and the town was left unoccupied.

The post office was moved to the American Flag Ranch headquarters in 1880. The building still stands, and is the oldest surviving territorial post office building in Arizona. The building is now on the National Register of Historic Places, and is preserved by the Oracle Historical Society.

See also 
 List of United States post offices

References

External links 
 Hike to American Flag Ranch

Ghost towns in Arizona
Former populated places in Pinal County, Arizona
Mining communities in Arizona
1870s establishments in Arizona Territory
Populated places established in the 1870s